The Battle of Hunterstown was an American Civil War skirmish at Beaverdam Creek near Hunterstown, Pennsylvania, on July 2, 1863, in which Wade Hampton's Confederate cavalry withdrew after engaging George Armstrong Custer's and Elon Farnsworth's Union cavalry.

Background
At dawn on July 2, 1863, the Union Army of the Potomac deployed near Gettysburg had cavalry posted elsewhere to protect the flanks and to look for Confederate activity, particularly Maj. Gen. J.E.B. Stuart's cavalry. Stuart arrived at Gen. Robert E. Lee's headquarters between noon and 1 p.m., and about an hour later Brig. Gen. Wade Hampton's exhausted brigade arrived. Stuart ordered Hampton to take a position to cover the left rear of the Confederate battle lines. Hampton moved into position astride the Hunterstown Road four miles northeast of Gettysburg, blocking access for any Union forces that might try to swing around behind Lee's lines. Two brigades of Union cavalry from Brig. Gen. Judson Kilpatrick's division under Brig. Gens. George Armstrong Custer and Elon J. Farnsworth were probing for the end of the Confederate left flank later the afternoon of July 2.

Engagement
Custer's men collided with Hampton on the road between Hunterstown and Gettysburg. As he led a charge of Company A, 6th Michigan Cavalry, against the Confederate rear guard, Custer fell under his wounded horse and was saved by his orderly, Norvell F. Churchill. Hampton wanted to escalate the action, positioning most of his brigade along a ridge in readiness to charge Custer's position. At that stage, Elon Farnsworth arrived with his brigade. Hampton did not press his attack, and an artillery duel ensued until dark when Hampton withdrew towards Gettysburg.

Aftermath
The battlefield (colloq. "North Cavalry Field", which is northeast of the Gettysburg Battlefield) is privately owned and includes a power plant. The village of Hunterstown has a small plaque commemorating the nearby engagement, and on July 2, 2008, a marble monument honoring Custer was unveiled and dedicated.

Notes

References
 Harman, Troy. Hunterstown: North Cavalry Field of Gettysburg. Hunterstown Historical Society website, accessed August 1, 2013.
 Kross, Gary. The Cavalry at Gettysburg, speech on September 14, 1995.
 Petruzzi, J. David, and Steven Stanley. The Complete Gettysburg Guide. New York: Savas Beatie, 2009. .
 Wittenberg, Eric J. Protecting the Flank at Gettysburg: The Battles for Brinkerhoff's Ridge and East Cavalry Field, July 2–3, 1863. El Dorado Hills, CA: Savas Beatie, 2013. .

External links
 Hunterstown Historical Society's Hunterstown 1863 website

Hunterstown
Hunterstown
Hunterstown
Huntertown
History of Adams County, Pennsylvania
July 1863 events